Calmoniidae is a family of trilobites from the order Phacopida, suborder Phacopina, superfamily Acastoidea.

It contains the following genera:

Anchiopella
Andinacaste
Australocaste
Australops
Awaria
Bainella
Belenops
Bouleia
Calmonia
Chiarumanipyge
Clarkeaspis
Cryphaeoides
Curuyella
Deltacephalaspis
Eldredgeia
Feistia
Hadrorachus
Jujuyops
Kozlowskiaspis
Malvinella
Malvinocooperella
Metacryphaeus
Morocconites
Oosthuizenella
Palpebrops
Parabouleia
Paracalmonia
Pennaia
Plesioconvexa
Plesiomalvinella
Prestalia
Probolops
Punillaspis
Renniella
Romanops
Schizostylus
Talacastops
Tarijactinoides
Tibagya
Tormesiscus
Typhloniscus
Vogesina
Wolfartaspis

See also
Malvinella buddeae

References

 
Trilobite families
Acastoidea